In the context of hairstyles, the usage of the term pigtail (or twin tail or twintail) shows considerable variation. The term may refer to a single braid, but is more frequently used in the plural ("pigtails") to refer to twin braids on opposite sides of the head. For some people, the term "pigtails" applies whether or not the hair is braided, but there is not widespread agreement on this (in places where this usage is common, unbraided pairs are called doggie ears or bunches and a single bunch, regardless of position on the head, is called a ponytail).

Word origin and usage 

The term pigtail appears in English in the American colonies in the 17th century to describe a twist of chewing tobacco. One of the steps in processing the tobacco was to twist a handful of leaves together to form a compact bunch that would then be cured (dried, either with or without smoking). The term "pigtail" was applied to the bunch based on its resemblance to a twisted pig's tail.

From the later 17th century through the 19th century, the term came to be applied to any braided ("plaited", in British parlance) hairstyle. The British army also adopted a single pigtail or "queue" as its standard dress for long hair. British barristers continue to wear a wig with pigtails as a way to hide the hairline in an attempt to provide basic anonymity. 

Robert Louis Stevenson mentions "pigtail" referring to hair and then to "pigtail tobacco" in the first and fourth chapters of Treasure Island, respectively.

Most modern dictionaries still define "pigtail" as a single tight braid. However, many speakers use the term to describe two symmetrical bunches of hair on either side of the head, braided or not.

Styles 
There are numerous styles of pigtails in which a person may wear their hair. They may be braided, straightened, beaded, ribboned, in buns, fishtailed, and even French braided. Pigtails can be placed on different parts of a person's head: high, low, or to the side.

In some regions of China, traditional culture related the wearing of pigtails to a girl's marital status. A young, unmarried, Chinese girl would often wear two buns, or bundles of hair on either side of the head to display her availability to prospective husbands. This style of pigtails is sometimes referred to as "ox horns." However, when this girl would marry, the two pigtails, or buns, would be replaced with just one, thus indicating her marriage.

The Manchu and later Qing dynasty men's coiffe called the "queue" is sometimes described incorrectly as a pigtail.

Bunches 

Bunches (also called pigtails, bunchies, twintails or angel wings) are a hairstyle in which the hair is parted down the middle and gathered into two symmetrical bundles, like ponytails, secured near the scalp. Sometimes this hairstyle is referred to as "pigtails", but in other cases the term "pigtails" applies only if the hair is braided.

In Japan 

Unbraided pigtails are extremely popular in Japan, especially in anime and manga fandom and Japanese otaku culture. Anime and manga characters sporting twintails have been prevalent since the 1960s, and the hairstyle has since entered mainstream culture, in part due to Vocaloid Hatsune Miku embracing the look. This includes the creation of a "Japan Twintail Association" to promote and celebrate the hairstyle, as well as running photo spreads of models sporting the dual tails. "Twin Tail Day" is officially recognized by the Japan Anniversary Association and falls on February 2, when girls post images of themselves with the hairstyle onto Twitter.

 In Japan, hair bunches are called '. A popular variation is the odango hairstyle, in which each ponytail is partially coiled around its base to form a small bun from which the remaining length hangs free.
 Schoolgirls in India customarily wear their hair in a pair of long braids, with the end of each braid looped up and fastened to its base with red ribbon.

See also 

 Pigtail Ordinance
 French braid
 List of hairstyles

References

External links 

 
 

Braid hairstyles
1990s fashion
2000s fashion
2010s fashion
2020s fashion
17th-century neologisms